Nate Dern (born November 30, 1984) is an American writer and actor. His first book, Not Quite a Genius, was published by Simon & Schuster on August 8, 2017. Dern is a senior writer at Funny Or Die and the former artistic director of the Upright Citizens Brigade Theatre in New York City. In 2007 Dern was a contestant on season 3 of the reality television series Beauty and the Geek.

Background and career
Dern was born and raised in Colorado. He attended Evergreen High School (Evergreen, Colorado) and then enrolled at Harvard University where he became a member and later tsar of the improv group The Immediate Gratification Players. After graduating from Harvard, Dern attended Cambridge University and earned an MPhil in Screen Media and Culture. Dern then moved to New York City to begin a Ph.D. program in sociology at Columbia University. While living in New York City, Dern began taking improv comedy classes at the Upright Citizens Brigade Theatre, eventually becoming a performer, then a teacher, then the artistic director. Dern joined Funny or Die as a senior writer in 2014.

Books

As a writer at Funny or Die in 2007, Dern received a book deal from Simon & Schuster.
Dern's first book, Not Quite a Genius, is a collection of humor pieces, short stories, and personal essays. It was originally entitled  In Case of Fire, Use Stairs: And Other Plans That Seemed Like a Good Idea at the Time. It was selected as a 2017 summer "must read" by Domino Magazine and Crave Online.

Dern has written for McSweeney's, "The New Yorker,"  "New York Magazine", "Outside Magazine", "Vice", and other outlets.

Filmography

Film

Television

References

External links
 
Dern on Simon & Schuster website

1984 births
Living people
21st-century American comedians
American television writers
American male television writers
Harvard University alumni
21st-century American screenwriters
21st-century American male writers